is a 2015 Japanese youth comedy drama film directed by Nobuhiro Doi, based on a true story. The film was released on May 1, 2015 in Japan.

Plot
Sayaka Kudo is a 'gyaru' who wears miniskirts and dyes her hair blonde. Although she is a second year senior high school student, she is on par academically to 4th grade elementary school students. She frequently transferred schools because she was unable to make friends. Eventually she attends a private all-girls high school where she plays and enjoys her extra-scholarly activities while skipping study altogether- here, she is caught and suspended for carrying cigarettes.

To prepare her for her university entrance examination, her mother sends her to Seiho Cram School. When her tutor, Yoshitaka Tsubota, hears about Sayaka's academic problems, he makes it his personal goal to help her enter the university of her choice — Keio University (considered one of the most prestigious and difficult to enter universities in Japan) — and to get back at her father.

Her father (who aims to get her younger brother Ryuta into pro baseball despite the latter's reluctance) labels her as an "air-head" and says she and her mother are being scammed by the cram school. Likewise, she is repeatedly belittled by her high school teacher, who believes that she is destined for failure. Sayaka becomes determined to study hard to prove them wrong. Over the course of the summer holidays of her second year, through to the exams at the end of her third year in high school, Sayaka works diligently, going without sleep to the extent that she nods off in her classes, forgoing dates with her friends, and dying her hair back to black and cutting it, to show her resolve. Her results progressively improve on practice tests and her academic deviation value increases tremendously from 30 to 70 in this short span of time. Despite facing numerous hardships along the way and nearly giving up, Sayaka, now with her whole family's support, is admitted to Keio University. The film concludes with a comedic montage of the various characters as they sing or dance to the ending song.

Cast
Kasumi Arimura as Sayaka Kudō
Atsushi Itō as Yoshitaka Tsubota
Shūhei Nomura as Reiji Mori
Yūhei Ōuchida as Ryūta Kudō
Kokoro Okuda as Mayumi Kudō
Morio Agata as Makoto Minegishi
Ken Yasuda as Takashi Nishimura
Airi Matsui as Mika Honda
Tetsushi Tanaka as Sayaka's Father
Yō Yoshida as Sayaka's Mother

Production
The film Flying Colors was first unveiled to the Japanese media on 13 November 2014. It is based on the bestselling novel  by Nobutaka Tsubota, the director of a private school. In this novel, Nobutaka writes about his experiences with his real-life pupil Sayaka Kobayashi and how she improved from a high school student who only had the knowledge of 4th year elementary school student to one who qualified for the prestigious Keio University in just 1.5 years. As of May 2015, this novel has sold over 1 million copies.

Reception
The film grossed  on its opening weekend at the Japanese box office. As of May 17, the film had grossed . It was the eighth highest-grossing Japanese film (together with Love Live! The film was released in China on April 14, 2016, earning  on its opening weekend.

On Film Business Asia, Derek Elley gave the film a 7 out of 10, calling it "an entertaining time-waster that hides its didactic messages beneath likeable performances by the two leads".

Awards and nominations

References

External links
 

映画 ビリギャル(2015) at allcinema 
映画 ビリギャル at KINENOTE 

2015 comedy-drama films
Films directed by Nobuhiro Doi
Japanese comedy-drama films
Japanese political satire films
Comedy films based on actual events
Toho films
Drama films based on actual events
Films about examinations and testing
2015 films
Gyaru in fiction
2010s Japanese films